The Central Pavilion Arena is a multi-purpose arena in Robstown, Texas with a capacity of just under 3,000.  Completed in December 2006, it was the home of the Corpus Christi Hammerheads of the Indoor Football League from 2007 to 2009.

External links

Richard M. Borchard Regional Fairgrounds

Indoor arenas in Texas
Sports venues in Texas
American football venues in Texas
2006 establishments in Texas
Sports venues completed in 2006